Sweatin' to the Oldies is a live album and video by the southern California punk rock band The Vandals, originally released in 1994 by Triple X Records. It consists of a live concert recorded at the Ice House in Fullerton, California, as well as interviews with the band members and an overview of their history. The original version was released both on CD and VHS. With most of their back catalogue out of print, the album and video were seen as a retrospective of the band's past, as performed by its most recent stable lineup.

Throughout the set the band performs all 6 songs from their 1982 debut EP Peace thru Vandalism, as well as a few songs from their first album, 1984's When in Rome Do as the Vandals, and a few from their 1990 album Fear of a Punk Planet. Notably absent from the set list are any songs from their 1989 album Slippery When Ill, which was composed primarily of country-style songs. Partway through the song "Wanna Be Manor," the band breaks into a cover of the song "Superficial Love" by T.S.O.L., another Orange County punk band who were contemporaries of the Vandals in the early- to mid-1980s.

In 1999 the album was re-released on the band's own Kung Fu Records label. This "Special Edition" re-release contained 3 bonus tracks not on the original release, which were recorded live on college radio station KUCI 88.9 at the University of California Irvine just prior to the release of their 1996 album The Quickening. The video was re-released by Kung Fu in 2002 as a double-disc DVD with additional performances, band commentary and other bonus material.

Track listing

Personnel
Dave Quackenbush - Vocals, guitar on "Teenage Idol"
Warren Fitzgerald - guitar, vocals on "Teenage Idol"
Joe Escalante - bass
Josh Freese - drums

Technical
Warren Fitzgerald - producer
Lisa Johnson - photography
Grace Walker - art direction

References

The Vandals albums
1994 live albums
Kung Fu Records live albums
Triple X Records live albums